Qodrat Kandi (also Romanized as Qodrat Kandī) is a village in Zarrineh Rud Rural District, in the Central District of Miandoab County, West Azerbaijan Province, Iran. At the 2006 census, its population was 164, in 39 families.

References 

Populated places in Miandoab County